Professor Paresh Kumar Narayan (born 1977), is an academic of Fiji Indian origin, who was Australia's youngest Professor of Finance, and is now at Monash University.

Early life and education
The eldest of three brothers, the others being Nilesh Narayan and Nitesh Narayan, Narayan was born in a farming community in Navua. He attended Vashist Muni Primary School, in Navua, then Mahatma Gandhi Memorial primary and secondary schools and finally, Suva Muslim College. On completing high school, he enrolled at the University of the South Pacific (USP) on a Government scholarship in a Bachelor of Arts program, majoring in economics and geography. After graduating, he worked as a tutor in economics at USP, while pursuing post- graduate studies in this field. In 1998, he was awarded a Japanese Government scholarship for a master's degree in development studies. He graduated in 1999 from USP with a gold medal for the having the best thesis. He then worked as a planning officer with the Fiji Islands Trade and Investment Bureau while he continued to teach at USP and the Central Queensland University international campus in Suva.

Study in Australia 
In 2001, he was awarded a Monash graduate school scholarship to study in Australia for three years. Professor Narayan completed his PhD in 18 months. His doctorate thesis, An Econometric Model of Tourism Demand and a Computable General Equilibrium Analysis of the Impact of Tourism: The Case of Fiji Islands was assessed to be the most outstanding work, earning him the Mollie Hollman Medal in 2004 at Monash University.

In addition, he received a Monash University postgraduate travel grant in 2002; the Australian Population Association Borrie Prize for an essay titled, Determinants of Female Fertility in Taiwan, 1966–2001: Evidence from Cointegration and Variance Decomposition Analysis, a postgraduate Publications Award in 2003 and numerous research grants.

Paresh is married to Seema Dhar. Seema is completed her PhD thesis in the area of current account sustainability for OECD countries at Monash University. Seema is also a gold medalist in Economics. Paresh and Seema have two sons.

Employment History 
On completion of his doctoral studies, Professor Paresh was appointed a lecturer at the Griffith Business School, on the Gold Coast, Australia, and was promoted to senior lecturer in 2005. In 2006, he became associate professor.

Paresh Kumar Narayan is presently an Alfred Deakin Professor at the Deakin Business School. He is the Director of the Centre for Economics & Financial Econometrics Research at Deakin University. He is also an adjunct Professor of finance in INCEIF (International Centre for Education in Islamic Finance) Malaysia

Papers and awards 
He has published more than 130 papers in renowned journals all over the world.

He has written chapters in books like South Asia in the Era of Globalisation: Trade, Industrialisation and Welfare; Economic Impact of Fiji's Sugar Industry, CGE Modelling and Behaviour of J-Curve.

He is an advisor to Econtech, one of Australia's leading economic consultancy firms, and two years ago he won the prestigious Excellence in Research Award, which he received from the Emerald Institute, a leading publishing institute in United Kingdom.

In 2014, Professor Narayan received the Scopus Young Researcher award for the best three authors in Australia in the Social Science category under the age of forty. In 2015, Professor Narayan was awarded the Mahatma Gandhi Pravasi Samman Award for non-resident Indians who have made substantial contributions to the profession, including contributions to public policy. In 2015 he also received the Gold Medal and Citation by the Indian Econometric Society.

View on Fijian Economy 
Narayan blamed the ousted Qarase government and its failure to implement macroeconomic management and stability for the post coup economic decline in Fiji. Earlier he had criticized the Qarase Government's 2007 budget as being "economically sick".

Other Professional Activities 
Professor Narayan has been a consultant to a number of esteemed institutions, such as the Asian Development Bank, the United Nations, the Commonwealth Secretariat, the International labour Organisation, and AusAID amongst others.

Professor Narayan is a co Editor-in-Chief of Economic Modelling, Associate Editor of Finance Research Letters and Studies in Economics & Finance, Subject Editor of Journal of International Financial Markets Institutions and Money and Guest Editor of the Journal of Banking & Finance and Energy Economics.

References

Fijian people of Indian descent
University of the South Pacific alumni
1977 births
Living people
Fijian emigrants to Australia
Australian economists
Energy economists
People from Navua
Australian people of Indo-Fijian descent
Academic staff of Deakin University
Fijian writers
Monash University alumni